The 1946 Southern Oregon Red Raiders football team was an American football team that represented Southern Oregon College of Education (now known as Southern Oregon University) as an independent during the 1946 college football season. In their first season under head coach Al Simpson, the Red Raiders compiled a perfect 8–0 record, defeated Central Washington in the Pear Bowl, held opponents to an average of 5.2 points per game, and outscored opponents by a total of 176 to 42. The team split its home game between Ashland and Medford, Oregon.

Schedule

References

Southern Oregon
Southern Oregon Raiders football seasons
College football undefeated seasons
Southern Oregon Red Raiders football